The 2000 Cheltenham Council election took place on 4 May 2000 to elect members of Cheltenham Borough Council in Gloucestershire, England. One third of the council was up for election and the Conservative Party stayed in overall control of the council.

After the election, the composition of the council was
Conservative 24
Liberal Democrat 12
People Against Bureaucracy 3
Labour 2

Background
Since the 1999 election the Conservatives had gained a majority on the council after 2 councillors including 1 Liberal Democrat had defected to them.

Election result
The results saw the Conservatives increase their majority on the council after gaining seats from the Liberal Democrats.

Ward results

References

2000 English local elections
2000
2000s in Gloucestershire